"A-Hunting We Will Go" is a popular folk song and nursery rhyme composed in 1777 by English composer Thomas Arne. Arne had composed the song for a 1777 production of The Beggar's Opera in London. 

The a- is an archaic intensifying prefix; compare "Here We Come A-wassailing/Here We Come A-caroling" and lyrics to "The Twelve Days of Christmas" (e.g., “Six geese a-laying”).

Lyrics 
A-hunting we will go, 
A-hunting we will go
Heigh-ho, the derry-o,
A-hunting we will go.

A-hunting we will go, 
A-hunting we will go
We'll catch a fox and put him in a box
And never let him go
(Modern versions often change the last line to “And then we’ll let him go”.)

Each consequent verse gets modified by putting in a different animal:
 "...a fish and put him on a dish..."
 "...a bear and cut his hair..."
 "...a pig and dance a little jig..."
 "...a giraffe and make him laugh..."
 "...a mouse and put him in a house..."
 ...

Earlier versions of the song switch the words "a-hunting" with "a-roving", dating back to old roving drinking songs from the 16th century.

See also 
 A-Haunting We Will Go (disambiguation), a title play on this song
 "Bye, baby Bunting, Daddy's Gone A-Hunting", a similarly constructed song 
 "The Farmer in the Dell" - a song with similar lyrics, content, and music
 Omar Little

References

1777 songs
Songs about hunters
Compositions by Thomas Arne